This is a list of manga that topped The New York Times Manga Best Seller list in 2015.

See also
 The New York Times Fiction Best Sellers of 2015
 The New York Times Non-Fiction Best Sellers of 2015
 List of Oricon number-one manga of 2015
 2015 in manga

References

2015
2015 in the United States
2015 in comics
Lists of manga